Donald Rashaad Singleton (born May 22, 1987) is an American basketball player who plays for ES Radès of the Championnat National A. Standing at , he plays as center. Singleton played four seasons of college basketball for Georgia, before turning professionally in 2009.

Career
On March 7, 2013, Singleton signed with the Singapore Slingers of the ASEAN Basketball League. He averaged 11.8 points and 10.4 rebounds per game in 11 ABL games.

In August 2013, Singleton signed in Japan with the Shimane Susanoo Magic. However, he left the team on August 22, before playing a game.

For the 2013–14 season, he signed with Al Morog in Libya. Here, he averaged 20.8 points, 17.4 rebounds and 4.2 blocks per game.

In November 2014, Singleton signed with Al-Wakrah SC in Qatar.

In February 2020, Singleton signed with GNBC in Madagascar to play in the inaugural season of the Basketball Africa League (BAL). However, the season was postponed due to the COVID-19 pandemic.

References

External links
 RealGM profile

1987 births
Living people
Ehime Orange Vikings players
Al-Wakrah SC basketball players
American expatriate basketball people in Japan
American expatriate basketball people in Qatar
American expatriate basketball people in Mexico
American expatriate basketball people in Thailand
Basketball players from Georgia (U.S. state)
Ezzahra Sports players
GNBC basketball players
Georgia Bulldogs basketball players
Indios de Mayagüez basketball players
Panteras de Aguascalientes players
People from St. Marys, Georgia
Sendai 89ers players
Singapore Slingers players